Mt. Zion Baptist Church is a historic church at 514 West North Street in Canton, Mississippi.

The Classical Revival building was constructed in 1929 and added to the National Register of Historic Places in 2000.

References

Churches on the National Register of Historic Places in Mississippi
Neoclassical architecture in Mississippi
Churches completed in 1929
1929 establishments in Mississippi
National Register of Historic Places in Madison County, Mississippi
Baptist churches in Mississippi
Neoclassical church buildings in the United States